Ruo'ao (died 764 BC) was from 790 to 764 BC the monarch of the state of Chu during the Western Zhou Dynasty of ancient China.  Born Xiong Yi, he was the first Chu ruler to be given a posthumous title.

Like other early Chu rulers, Ruo'ao held the hereditary noble rank of viscount that was first granted to his ancestor, also named Xiong Yi (熊繹, different in Chinese characters), by King Cheng of Zhou.

Ruo'ao succeeded his father Xiong E, who died in 791 BC.  He reigned for 27 years and was succeeded by his son Xiao'ao.

References

Monarchs of Chu (state)
8th-century BC Chinese monarchs
764 BC deaths
Year of birth unknown